Mercurialis or variant forms may refer to:

 Mercurialis (plant), a genus of plants in the family Euphorbiaceae
 Girolamo Mercuriale or Mercuriali (1530–1606), Italian philologist and physician
 Mercurialis of Forlì (Italian: Mercuriale) (died c. 406), bishop of Forlì

See also